Heide Park Resort, commonly known as Heide Park, is a theme park in Soltau, Lower Saxony, Germany. With an overall area of over 850,000 m2 (210 acres), it is the largest amusement park in Northern Germany and among the largest in the country. It is part of the British-based Merlin Entertainments which operates 123 attractions in 24 countries.

History
The site originally belonged to the Heidenhof Wildlife Park, which was named after the chapel that was built there in 1350. After the zoo was closed in 1972 following a devastating storm, the showman Hans-Jürgen Tiemann bought the land and opened a small amusement park in 1978 (with the contractual requirement to maintain Heidenhof Chapel as well as the keeping of native animals). When Heide Park opened on 19 August 1978 it offered only six rides: the Monzapiste, the Heide Park Express, the Oldtimerrundkurs, the Floßfahrt (tow boat ride), the Wichtelhausenbahn and the Hochbahn. In its first season, the Heide Park had just under 200,000 visitors. 1979 saw the first dolphin show, for which they built a large domed roof a year later (after the 2008 season, the dolphinarium was closed due to protests).

The Heide-Dorf (Heath Village), a richly detailed replica of typical buildings from the Lüneburg Heath, was inaugurated in the 1988 season. In 1996/'97 the Dutch section of the park was built with a windmill and canal at the other end of the park.

With the growth of the park, the catchment area grew as well. In the 1990s, up to two million people visited Heide-Park each season with 2,100,000 guests in 2001. The following year the UK-based Tussauds Group bought the park and since then attendance to the park has decreased to 1.5 - 1.6 million visitors per annum. Hans-Jürgen Tiemann still has influence in the park by shares and as an advisory director of the Tussauds Group. In early 2007 the Merlin Entertainments Group bought the majority of the shares of Tussauds Group from Dubai International Capital, which had taken over the shares in 2005.

The most recognizable landmark in the park is a 1/3 scale replica of the Statue of Liberty (35 meters tall), it was inaugurated on 4 July 1986 on the 100th anniversary of the original statue. At the end of 2011 the whole structure was relocated to stand within the roller coaster Colossos. The park's mascot is a bear called Wumbo.

In the 1990s, Hans-Jurgen Tiemann was successful as a driver and sponsor on the touring-car racing circuit, while his son Marcel Tiemann began a career as a professional race car driver.

The Park's owner, The Tussauds Group, was sold in May 2007 to the Blackstone Group. The Tussauds Group as a separate entity ceased to exist, and was merged into the Blackstone-owned Merlin Entertainments which has since operated the Park.

Music and events
The music played at Heide Park is a combination of commercial tracks, library music and commissioned music. The following composers have had their music played at the park: Graham Smart, Ian Habgood, David Buckley, Crispin Merrell, IMAscore and John Sanderson.

Halloween in October is a special event.

Heide Park Resort

Hotel Port Royal was opened in 2007 with 150 family rooms and 16 suites. There is also a Holiday Camp that opened in 2005 with 81 wooden houses in Caribbean style with a total of 536 beds.

Park areas
The park is divided into five areas.
 Eingang & Ausgang, that features Lower-Saxony style buildings
 Bucht der Piraten, that is mainly themed around the world of pirates
 Transilvanien, with a medieval-style castle on top of the hill surrounded by a forest
 Land der Vergessenen, which hosts the park's award-winning wooden roller coaster Colossos - Kampf der Giganten, as well as the Mayan Village that has many flat rides.
 Exploria

Attractions
Heide Park currently has about 40 rides which are mainly aimed at families but its thrill rides are also very popular.
One of the main attractions is Colossos - Kampf der Giganten, a wooden roller coaster, which until the opening of Balder, on 12 April 2003 in the Swedish amusement park Liseberg, was the steepest wooden roller coaster in the world.  The latest attraction is the wing coaster Flug der Dämonen. It is Germany's first wing coaster and reaches a maximum of 4 g positive during the ride.

Roller coasters

Water rides

Other attractions 

Krake Alive! - a 7 min horror maze (2012); Heide Park. This indoor horror maze has 7 different scenes in the 300 sq m building with plenty of special effects and live actors as well. Age limit 12 years.

Go Karts - go karts (2004); extra charge

Kiddie Rides
Koggenfahrt - circular ride (1982); Mack Rides.
Lucky Land - play area with gold digging, horse shoe throwing, etc. (2008).
Nostalgic Carousel - Venettian Carousel (1997); Bertazzon.
Pizie Town Train - on track ride (1978); Mack Rides.
Rotor Baron - airplanes (1985); ETZ Marcel Lutz.
Screamie - a 12m tall mini drop tower (2008); Zierer.
Sea Horse Bay - paddle boats for kids (2005); Klarer Freizeitlagen.
Steam Carousel - carousel (1989); Peter Petz.
Water Playground - water play area (1991).
Wild West bucketwheel - mini Ferris wheel (2008); Zierer.
Peppa's Boat Trip - boat ride - Peppa Pig theme (2018); Metallbau Emmeln
George's Dino Adventure - tracked horse ride Peppa Pig theme (2018); Metallbau Emmeln
Grandpa Pig's Train Tide - train ride - Peppa Pig theme (2018)
Peppa's Hot Air Balloon Ride - balloon ride - Peppa Pig theme (2020)

Shows

Five shows are available each day at Heide Park, these are;

 Anger of Mayan, a 25-minute show about Mayan Indians at the Mayan Amphitheater that was built in 2011 and seats 800 people.
 Gold of Port Royal, a 35-minute pirate show at Pirate Arena that was built in 2010 and seats 1200 people.
 Puppet Comet, a 10-minute puppet show at Puppet Comic Theatre, built in 1985 and seats 100 people.
 Madagaskar LIVE! - It's Circus Time, a 30-minute show based on the movie Madagaskar 3: Flucht durch Europa in a tent, built in 2013.
 Previous shows include The Dolphin Show (closed 2008), The Parrot Show (closed 2008), The Bird Theater (closed 2009) and Hello Spencer (closed 2016).

Trivia
 Heide Park was one of three playable real world parks (with Alton Towers and Blackpool Pleasure Beach) added to RollerCoaster Tycoon in the Loopy Landscapes expansion pack.

Gallery
Main gallery: Heide Park at WikiCommons

References

External links

 Official Flash-Website of the Heide-Park
 Heide-Park Holiday-Camp
 Heide-Park-world - Info, Photos, Forum, Gallery etc.

 
1978 establishments in West Germany
Amusement parks in Germany
Buildings and structures in Lower Saxony
Economy of Lower Saxony
Lüneburg Heath
Merlin Entertainments Group
Tourist attractions in Lower Saxony
Amusement parks opened in 1978